Tim Yohannan (August 15, 1945 – April 3, 1998), also known as Tim Yo, was the founder of Maximum Rocknroll, a radio show and fanzine documenting punk subculture. He also helped in establishing a number of DIY collectives, such as 924 Gilman Street, Blacklist Mailorder, and the Epicenter Zone record store.

Biography
Yohannan was initially a 1960s counterculture-era leftist, before shifting this ideology to the punk scene. Issue 425 of Maximumrocknroll stated, "Tim Yo was a Marxist!" He helped mold the early 1980s American punk scene, and tied in various international punk scenes, through documenting them in Maximum Rocknroll, a fanzine he founded in 1982. As the zine became popular and profitable, Yohannan donated those profits to zines and collectives, even as he continued blue-collar work in the Lawrence Hall of Science at University of California, Berkeley.

As a self-appointed "punks' herdsman", Yohannan had a reputation as being notoriously difficult.

Yohannan died at 53 on April 3, 1998 from complications from lymphatic cancer.

Tim Yohannan had a daughter. While he acknowledged her as his biological daughter, he chose to not participate in her life.

Subject of songs
Yohannan's divisive personality was described in the NOFX song "I'm Telling Tim" from their 1997 album So Long and Thanks for All the Shoes. NOFX would later mention missing him in their song "We Threw Gasoline On The Fire And Now We Have Stumps For Arms And No Eyebrows" from Punk-O-Rama III.

The band Green Day recorded the song "Platypus (I Hate You)", "Take Back", and "Prosthetic Head" on their 1997 album Nimrod. The songs do not directly mention Yohannan. However, frontman Billie Joe Armstrong tweeted on February 17, 2011 (and deleted the tweet a few hours later), "Platypus was written for Tim Yohanon. And I pray to god I misspelled his name. Rest in shit you fucking cunt". The song "Ha Ha You're Dead" from the band's album, Shenanigans, was also written about Yohannan after he died.

The band MDC recorded a tribute to Yohannan titled "Timmy Yo" on their 2004 studio album Magnus Dominus Corpus.

Mentioned in song Suzanne is Getting Married by Screeching Weasel.

Julio Rey of Christian punk band The Lead recorded a demo track in 2011 titled, "What I Should Have Told Tim Yohannan Back In 1985" recalling an earlier incident in which Yohannan refused to run an ad for the band, returned the check, and the two men exchanged a few letters.

The Rhythm Pigs' "Little Brother", off their 1987 Choke on This LP, makes sarcastic reference "to acceptable behaviour in the scene" and "Maximum Rock n' Roll.....big brotha's little brother," a reference to Yohannan's short height.

References

Further reading
 Todd Taylor, "Bad Taste is in the Majority: Interview with Tim Yohannan and Jen Angel of Maximumrock’n’roll," Razorcake, Oct. 18-19, 2011. Part One | Part Two

External links
Maximumrocknroll official site
the 924 Gilman Street Project
Slingshot obituary: A Salute to Tim Yohannon
Salon obituary: The Day Punk Died
Online Memorial: Memorial guestbook setup on the day Tim died

1945 births
1998 deaths
Punk people
Deaths from lymphoma